is a Japanese badminton player.

Career 
Ayumi Mine was the champion at the 2016 in U.S. Open Badminton Championships and also played at the Spanish International, 2016 Vietnam Open Grand Prix, 2016 Chinese Taipei Masters, 2015 Japan Super Series and at the 2016 Indonesian Masters Grand Prix Gold, where she lost in the quarterfinals to Nichaon Jindapon from Thailand.

Achievements

BWF World Tour (1 runner-up) 
The BWF World Tour, announced on 19 March 2017 and implemented in 2018, is a series of elite badminton tournaments, sanctioned by Badminton World Federation (BWF). The BWF World Tour are divided into six levels, namely World Tour Finals, Super 1000, Super 750, Super 500, Super 300 (part of the HSBC World Tour), and the BWF Tour Super 100.

Women's singles

BWF Grand Prix (2 titles, 1 runner-up) 
The BWF Grand Prix had two levels, the BWF Grand Prix and Grand Prix Gold. It was a series of badminton tournaments sanctioned by the Badminton World Federation (BWF) which was held from 2007 to 2017.

Women's singles

  BWF Grand Prix Gold tournament
  BWF Grand Prix tournament

BWF International Challenge/Series (3 titles, 3 runners-up) 
Women's singles

  BWF International Challenge tournament
  BWF International Series tournament
  BWF Future Series tournament

References

External links 
 
 

1992 births
Living people
People from Kariya, Aichi
Sportspeople from Aichi Prefecture
Japanese female badminton players